Cuba–Poland relations refers to the diplomatic relations between Cuba and Poland. Both nations are members of the United Nations.

History

One of the first Polish migrants to arrive to Cuba was Carlos Roloff who became a General in the Cuban War of Independence from Spain and fought alongside Cuban independence leader José Martí. Between 1920 and 1928, several hundred Polish families arrived to Cuba, however for most of the migrants, Cuba was a stop-over to the United States. Around this time, 10,000 Polish Jews arrived to Cuba. In 1927, the "Union of Polish People" was founded in Cuba to serve the Polish community in the island-nation.

In 1933, Cuba and Poland establish diplomatic relations. After World War II, Poland adopted a communist system of governance. In January 1959, Fidel Castro took power in Cuba and began to establish ties with communist nations. In 1960, both nations re-establish diplomatic relations and that same year, Cuba opened an embassy in Warsaw. In September 1960, President Fidel Castro met with Polish First Secretary Władysław Gomułka during the United Nations summit in New York City. In 1962, Polish Foreign Minister Adam Rapacki visited Cuba becoming the first highest ranking Polish official to visit the country.

In 1972, Cuban President Fidel Castro paid an official visit to Poland. In January 1975, head of the Polish government, First Secretary Edward Gierek paid an official visit to Cuba. Cuba and Poland established strong diplomatic links during the Cold war. Between 1962 and 1988 more than 35 thousand Cubans studied in Poland.

After the fall of communism in Poland in 1989, relations between the two nations nearly ceased as Poland aligned its interest with the United States. Between 1990 and 1995, most of the remaining Polish residents in Cuba returned to Poland or immigrated to the United States. In 2009, Poland's equality minister, Elżbieta Radziszewska proposed to expand a Polish law prohibiting the production of fascist and totalitarian propaganda including images of Cuban revolutionary hero Ernesto "Che" Guevara. In June 2017, Polish Foreign Minister Witold Waszczykowski paid an official visit to Cuba, becoming the first high ranking Polish official to visit the country in over 30 years.

High-level visits
High-level visits from Cuba to Poland
 President Fidel Castro (1972)

High-level visits from Poland to Cuba
 Foreign Minister Adam Rapacki (1962)
 First Secretary Edward Gierek (1975)
 Foreign Minister Witold Waszczykowski (2017)

Tourisim and transportation
In 2016, 40,000 Polish citizens visited Cuba for tourisim. There are direct charter flights between Cuba and Poland with LOT Polish Airlines.

Trade
In 2016, trade between Cuba and Poland totaled US$48.7 million. Cuba's main exports to Poland include: fish and other seafood, coffee, conserved fruit, alcoholic drinks and tobacco. Poland's main exports to Cuba include: dairy products, grains, meat, airplanes and parts and agricultural equipment.

Resident diplomatic missions
 Cuba has an embassy in Warsaw.
 Poland has an embassy in Havana.

See also
 Sigmund Sobolewski

Bibliography 
Stosunki dyplomatyczne Polski. Informator. Tom II Ameryka Północna i Południowa 1918-2007, Ministerstwo Spraw Zagranicznych, Archiwum/Wydawnictwo Askon Warszawa 2008, 224 s.,

References 

 
Poland
Bilateral relations of Poland